Franklin North was a parliamentary electorate in the southern part of the Auckland Region of New Zealand from 1881 to 1890.

Population centres
The previous electoral redistribution was undertaken in 1875 for the 1875–1876 election. In the six years since, New Zealand's European population had increased by 65%. In the 1881 electoral redistribution, the House of Representatives increased the number of European representatives to 91 (up from 84 since the 1875–76 election). The number of Māori electorates was held at four. The House further decided that electorates should not have more than one representative, which led to 35 new electorates being formed, including Franklin North, and two electorates that had previously been abolished to be recreated. This necessitated a major disruption to existing boundaries.

Franklin North included the towns of Papatoetoe, and Papakura from 1881 to 1887. In 1887 with the growth of Auckland Franklin North contracted in area, and Papakura was transferred to Franklin South.

History
The electorates of Franklin North and Franklin South were created from the former  electorate in 1881, and were absorbed back into the reconstituted Franklin electorate in 1890.

The first representative was Benjamin Harris, who had since the  represented the Franklin electorate.

Captain Harris beat Frank Buckland by just two votes. Early in 1882, Buckland petitioned to the courts against the election on various grounds. The case was heard by the Chief Justice, James Prendergast, and Justice Gillies, who declared the election void. Harris won the subsequent .

Members of Parliament
The electorate was represented by three Members of Parliament:

Key

Election results

1882 by-election

1881 election

Notes

References

Historical electorates of New Zealand
1881 establishments in New Zealand
1890 disestablishments in New Zealand
New Zealand electorates in the Auckland Region